"Typical Male" is a song recorded by American singer Tina Turner. It was written by Terry Britten and Graham Lyle and produced by the former for Turner's studio album Break Every Rule (1986).

The song hit number one in Cash Box magazine and just missed becoming her second number-one hit on the US Billboard Hot 100 chart, peaking at number two for three consecutive weeks.  It reached number three on the Billboard R&B Chart. The B-side of the single was "Don't Turn Around", covered by Bonnie Tyler, Aswad, and Ace of Base. Phil Collins plays drums on the song. "Typical Male" is unusual for a pop song, in that the chorus includes a single measure in 2/4 time.

Music video
In the music video, Turner is seen in a red minidress, flirting with a lawyer. She plays games with him, such as chess and Scrabble in order to get his attention. Throughout the video, Turner is seen hugging and leaning against a statue of the lawyer's leg. At one point in the video, she and the lawyer are sitting on a gigantic telephone headpiece, and she jumps up and down on one end of the phone sending the lawyer high into the air. At the end of the video, Turner and the lawyer are seen walking together holding hands.

Personnel 
 Tina Turner – lead vocals 
 Nick Glennie-Smith – keyboards 
 Terry Britten – guitars, bass, backing vocals 
 Phil Collins – drums 
 Tim Cappello – saxophone solo 
 Tessa Niles – backing vocals

Charts

Weekly charts

Year-end charts

References

1986 singles
1986 songs
Cashbox number-one singles
Tina Turner songs
Songs written by Terry Britten
Songs written by Graham Lyle
Funk rock songs
Capitol Records singles